Blair Goldesbrough Stockwell  (born 17 December 1949) is a former racing cyclist & business owner from New Zealand. He won three bronze medals representing New Zealand at the Commonwealth Games.

Cycling career
At the 1970 British Commonwealth Games he won the bronze medal in the men's individual pursuit over 4000 m. Four years later at the 1974 British Commonwealth Games in Christchurch he won a bronze riding as part of the team pursuit. At the following Games in Edmonton 1978 he came 30th in the men's road race. Stockwell won his third bronze at the 1982 Brisbane Games in the men's team time trial. He competed at the 1972 Summer Olympics in the men's team pursuit finishing in 14th position.

Stockwell (1972, 1980 and 1984) and Jack Swart are the only cyclists to have won the Dulux North Island Tour three times.

In the 1982 Queen's Birthday Honours, Stockwell was appointed a Member of the Order of the British Empire, for services to cycling.

References

External links
 
 
 
 

1949 births
Living people
New Zealand male cyclists
Commonwealth Games bronze medallists for New Zealand
Cyclists at the 1970 British Commonwealth Games
Cyclists at the 1974 British Commonwealth Games
Cyclists at the 1978 Commonwealth Games
Cyclists at the 1982 Commonwealth Games
Cyclists at the 1972 Summer Olympics
Olympic cyclists of New Zealand
Cyclists from Christchurch
New Zealand Members of the Order of the British Empire
Commonwealth Games medallists in cycling
Medallists at the 1970 British Commonwealth Games
Medallists at the 1974 British Commonwealth Games
Medallists at the 1978 Commonwealth Games